The 2018 Super Taikyu Series was the 27th season of the Super Taikyu Series. The season will start on 31 March at Suzuka Circuit and end on 4 November at Okayama International Circuit. #99 GTNET Motorsports is the Champion and the 4th overall title for a Nissan GTR GT3

Teams and drivers

Calendar and results
The 2018 schedule was announced in January 2018.

Championship standings

Notes:
† – Drivers did not finish the race, but were classified as they completed over 75% of the race distance.

References

External links
 Official website of the Super Taikyu Series

2018 in Japanese motorsport
2018 in TCR Series